Césaire Rabenoro (27 August 1923 – 24 January 2002) was a Malagasy writer, teacher and politician. He served as the Minister of Foreign Affairs of Madagascar between 1991 and 1993 and the key person to Peace Corps Volunteers' first intervention to Madagascar. He also served as ambassador to the United Kingdom, France, Italy, Greece and Israel.

He wrote several books about external affairs, most notably "Les relations extérieures de Madagascar" published on May 3, 2000. He died on 24 January 2002, at the age of 78.

References

1923 births
2002 deaths
Malagasy politicians
Foreign Ministers of Madagascar
Ambassadors of Madagascar to the United Kingdom
Ambassadors of Madagascar to France